Christopher Bauder (born 1973 in Stuttgart) is a German interaction designer and media artist who lives and works in Berlin. His projects focus on the translation of bits and bytes into objects and environments and vice versa. Space, object, sound, light, and interaction are the key elements of his work.

Biography 
Christopher Bauder started creating large-scale spatial art installations and lighting design after finishing his studies in the Digital Media Class at the Berlin University of the Arts. His projects focus on the translation of bits and bytes into objects and environments and vice versa. Space, object, sound, light, and interaction are the key elements of his work.
In 2004 he founded the multidisciplinary art and design studio WHITEvoid as a necessity to realize his large scale art and design pieces and environments. The studio is composed of specialists in interaction design, media design, product design, interior architecture, and electronic engineering.

He is best known for his city-wide light art installation Lichtgrenze, created in 2014 together with his brother Marc, for the 25th anniversary of the Fall of the Berlin Wall.

Work 
Christopher Bauder has brought his installations and performances to events and spaces around the world, including the Centre Pompidou in Paris, The National Museum of Fine Arts in Taiwan, Museum of Design in Zurich, CTM & Transmediale in Berlin, MUTEK in Montreal and Mexico City, The Festival of Lights in Lyon and other countless festivals.

His projects have received worldwide recognition and have won several awards including the German Lighting Design Award, the Design Award of the Federal Republic of Germany, the Cannes Lions, the Red Dot Design Award and the iF Communication Design Award.

Artworks 
 SKALAR (2018)
 Stalactite (2018)
 Deep Web(2016)
 Circular 
 Lichtgrenze (2014)
 Grid (2013)
 Fluidic (2013)
 Atom (2007)

Selected exhibitions and shows 
2020/2021 
 Dark Matter Solo Exhibition, Berlin, Germany 
2018
 CTM Festival, Berlin, Germany
 Bright Brussels Festival, Brussels, Belgium
2017
 LOST Artfestival / The Dark Rooms, Berlin, Germany 
 LUZA Algarve International Festival of Light, Loule, Portugal
2016
 CTM Festival, Berlin, Germany
 Festival of Lights, Lyon, France
 Luminale – Light Festival, Frankfurt am Main, Germany
 Fuorisalone – Milan Design Week, Italy
2015
 Lumières – The Play of brilliants (Éléphant Paname), Paris, France
2014
 Lichtgrenze, City of Berlin, Germany
 Effektorium – Mendelssohn Museum, Leipzig, Germany
2013
 Festival of Lights, Lyon, France
 Arma17, Moscow, Russia
2012
 UnSound Festival, Krakow, Poland
 Cultures Electroni[k], Rennes, France
 Science Center Daegu, South Korea
2011
 MUTEK Festival, Mexico City
 Cervantino Festival, Guanajuato Mexico
 EKKO Festival, Bergen Norway
 Interaction I/O/I Show, Design Museum, Barcelona Spain
 Soundframe Festival, Vienna Austria
2009
 FREEZE! Art Show, National Taiwan Museum of Fine Arts, Taiwan
 TRAMA Festival, Porto, Portugal
 Berghain / Elektroakkustischer Salon, Berlin
 MUTEK Festival, Montreal, Canada
 STRP Festival, Eindhoven Netherlands
2008
 Centre Pompidou, Paris, France
 SMUK Festival, Skanderborg, Denmark
 Media Facades Festival, Berlin
2007
 TESLA Art Space, Berlin
 Palazzo delle Esposizioni, Rome, Italy
 Museum of Design, Zurich, Switzerland
2006
 LUMINALE Light Art Festival, Frankfurt
 SIGGRAPH Art Show, Boston, USA
2005
 Transmediale Festival, Berlin
 NEXT Art and Technology, Copenhagen, Denmark
2004
 Museum of Technology, Vienna, Austria
2003
 Artespace, German Museum, Munich
2002
 Pinakothek der Moderne, Munich, DE
 Museum of Telecommunication, Berlin, DE

Selected awards 
2018
 darc awards Best Light Art Scheme (GOLD)
2016
 German Design Award GOLD
 German Design Award
 iF Design Award GOLD
 iF Design Award
 darc awards Best Light Art Scheme (GOLD)
2015
 Cannes Lions GOLD
 Cannes Lions 2 x BRONZE
 ADC Awards GRAND PRIX
 ADC Awards 5 x GOLD
 ADC Awards SILVER
 ADC Awards BRONZE
 D&AD Award SILVER
 Red Dot Award
 Iconic Award Best of Best (GOLD)
 German Design Award
2014
 German Design Award for Space Frame 
 red dot award for Space Frame
 LIA (Lightair International Award) for Space Frame
 if design award for FLUIDIC

2013
 Annual Multimedia Award for FLUIDIC
 Der Raum - No Award Bullshit for FLUIDIC

2012
 Interior Innovation Award for Kinetic Lights
 Red Dot Ward for Living Sculpture 3D Module System (Product Design) and Light Configurator (Communication Design)

2010
 Design Award of the Federal Republic of Germany

2009
 W3 Award “Best in Show”
 iF Communication Design Award "interface"
 iF Communication Design Award "structure"
 WEBBY Award
 REDDOT Communication Design Award

References

External links 
 Christopher Bauder
 WHITEvoid studio

German artists
Living people
Berlin University of the Arts alumni
1973 births